Toby Miller (9 August 1958) is a British/Australian-American cultural studies and media studies scholar. He is the author of several books and articles. He was chair of the Department of Media & Cultural Studies at the University of California, Riverside (UCR) and is most recently a professor at Loughborough University. Prior to his academic career, Miller worked in broadcasting, banking, and civil service.

He is also the Editor-in-Chief of the open-access journal Open Cultural Studies, published by De Gruyter.

Biography
Miller was born in the United Kingdom and grew up in Australia.  He earned a B.A. in history and political science at Australian National University in 1980 and a PhD in philosophy and communication studies at Murdoch University in 1991.

In July 2004, Miller became a full-time professor at UCR following a stint as a visiting professor.  Formerly, he was a professor in the Departments of English, Sociology, and Women's Studies, as well as director of the program in film and visual culture.  As of December 2008, he chairs the new Department of Media & Cultural Studies. Preceding his professorship at UCR, Miller was a professor at New York University, and held previous appointments at Murdoch University, Griffith University, and the University of New South Wales. Professor Miller is now a Professor in the Institute for Media and Creative Industries at Loughborough University London.

Selected publications 
Miller's work has been translated into Chinese, Japanese, Swedish, and Spanish.

Articles

Books and monographs

Chapters in books

References

External links 
 
 Prof. Miller's UCR faculty page
 Toby Miller's GreenCitizen blog

1958 births
Living people
Australian National University alumni
Murdoch University alumni
University of California, Riverside faculty
Cultural academics
Mass media theorists
Gender studies academics
People educated at Canberra Grammar School